Blind Melon is an alternative rock band, whose most notable work dates from 1992 to 1995, and ceased with the death of lead vocalist Shannon Hoon. In 2006, the band reformed with a new lead vocalist, Travis Warren. From 1992–1996 the band released three studio albums. They have also released two compilations albums and one live album. They are best known for the 1993 song "No Rain" which reached number 1 in the United States and Canada. Other songs that charted include "Tones of Home" (1992) and "Galaxie" (1995).

Albums

Studio albums

Compilation albums

Live album

Singles

Music videos

Notes

References

Discographies of American artists
Rock music group discographies